Rockhampton is an electoral district of the Legislative Assembly in the Australian state of Queensland.

Wedged between the electoral districts of Keppel to the east and Mirani to the west, Rockhampton encompasses the bulk of the regional city of Rockhampton and many of its outlying developed areas, including the community of Gracemere.

History
In 1864, the Additional Members Act created six additional electoral districts, each returning 1 member:
 Clermont
 Kennedy
 Maryborough
 Mitchell
 Rockhampton
 Warrego

The first elections in these six electorates were held in 1865 (that is, during a parliamentary term and not as part of a general election across Queensland). The nomination date for the election in Rockhampton was 30 January 1865 and the election was held on 1 February 1865.

Members for Rockhampton

Election results

References

External links
 

Rockhampton
Rockhampton